The great snipe (Gallinago media) is a small stocky wader in the genus Gallinago. This bird's breeding habitat is marshes and wet meadows with short vegetation in north-eastern Europe, including north-western Russia. Great snipes are migratory, wintering in Africa. The European breeding population is in steep decline.

Taxonomy
The great snipe was described by the English naturalist John Latham in 1787 with the binomial name Scolopax media. The name of the current genus Gallinago is New Latin for a woodcock or snipe from Latin gallina, "hen" and the suffix -ago, "resembling". The specific media is Latin for "intermediate", because this species is intermediate in size between the woodcock and the common snipe.

Description

At  in length and a  wingspan, adults are only slightly larger, but much bulkier, than the common snipe and have a shorter bill. The body is mottled brown on top and barred underneath. They have a dark stripe through the eye. The wings are broad, and a pale wingbar is visible in flight.

The voice is described as a faint yeah. Mating display calls of groups can be heard at long distances (more than ) and sound like a mixture of firecracker wind-up xylophone sounds.

Behaviour and ecology

The birds are noted for their fast, non-stop flying capabilities over huge distances. Their wings are not especially aerodynamic, lacking pointed tips, and they typically do not stop to feed despite having opportunities. The birds instead rely on stores of fat.

At dusk during the breeding season, the males display at a lek (arena), standing erect with chest puffed and tail fanned out. They may jump into the air, and will produce a variety of rattles, clicks, buzzes and whistles while displaying. Three to four eggs are laid in a well-hidden nest on the ground.

These birds forage in soft mud, probing or picking up food by sight. They mainly eat insects and earthworms, and occasional plant material. They are difficult to see, being well camouflaged in their habitat. When flushed from cover, they fly straight for a considerable distance before dropping back into vegetation.

Migration 
In their seasonal migrations between Sweden and sub-Saharan Africa, great snipes make non-stop flights of 4,000–7,000 km, lasting 60–90 h. During these flights, great snipes repeatedly changed altitudes around dawn and dusk, between average cruising heights about 2,000 m (above sea level) at night and around 4,000 m during daytime. Most birds regularly flew at 6,000 m and one bird reached 8,700 m, possibly the highest altitude ever recorded for a migrating bird.

Fossils 
Fossils of the great snipe have been uncovered in North Carolina, dating back to about 4.465 Ma ±0.865M. This suggests that the bird must have at some point relocated across the Atlantic Ocean.

Status
In 2012, there were estimated to be between 15,000 and 40,000 great snipe in Scandinavia and between 450,000 and 1,000,000 in western Siberia and northeastern Europe. The species is experiencing a population decline, owing primarily to habitat loss, as well as to hunting in eastern Europe and in its African wintering range. The species is classified by the International Union for Conservation of Nature as "Near Threatened". The great snipe is one of the species to which the Agreement on the Conservation of African-Eurasian Migratory Waterbirds (AEWA) applies.

References

Further reading

External links 

 Great snipe at Handbook of Birds of the World 
 
 
 
 
 
 
 
 

Gallinago
Wading birds
Birds of Europe
Birds of Scandinavia
Great snipe
Great snipe